Denis Dechko (born 26 April 1990) is a Belarusian former footballer.

Honours
Minsk
Belarusian Cup winner: 2012–13

Dinamo Brest
Belarusian Cup winner: 2016–17

External links

Profile at FC Minsk website

1990 births
Living people
Association football goalkeepers
Belarusian footballers
FC PMC Postavy players
FC Partizan Minsk players
FC Minsk players
FC Bereza-2010 players
FC Dynamo Brest players
FC Belshina Bobruisk players